The Uganda Scheme was a proposal presented at the Sixth World Zionist Congress in Basel in 1903 by Zionism founder Theodor Herzl to create a Jewish homeland in a portion of British East Africa. He presented it as a temporary refuge for Jews to escape rising antisemitism in Europe. At the congress the proposal met stiff resistance.

History
British Colonial Secretary Joseph Chamberlain was aware of the ambitions of the Zionist Organization, which had been on his mind during a trip to East Africa earlier in the year. Chamberlain noted during his trip that, "If Dr Herzl were at all inclined to transfer his efforts to East Africa there would be no difficulty in finding land suitable for Jewish settlers."

Herzl was introduced to Chamberlain by Israel Zangwill in the spring of 1903, a few weeks after the outbreak of the Kishinev pogroms.

Chamberlain offered  at Uasin Gishu (also spelled "Gwas Ngishu"), an isolated area atop the Mau Escarpment in modern Kenya (not Uganda).

The land was thought suitable because of its temperate hill station-like climate and its relative isolation, being surrounded by the Mau Forest. The offer was a response to pogroms against the Jews in Russia, and it was hoped the area could be a temporary refuge from persecution for the Jewish people.

Chamberlain saw the land as he was passing by on the Uganda Railway, although the land was not in fact in Uganda but in the East Africa Protectorate (modern Kenya). This territory had only recently been transferred from the Uganda Protectorate to the East Africa Protectorate in 1902, as part of the Uganda Railway development plan.

Herzl presented the plan at the Sixth Zionist Congress but it faced resistance from many of the 573 assembled delegates. They considered it a betrayal of the 1897 Basel Program which had promoted settlement in Palestine. A proposal to form an exploratory committee to consider the offer and investigate the land in question won the formal support of the congress but it caused a rift between those who were in favor of the plan and those who were against it. The Russian delegates in particular were unhappy with the plan. "These people have a rope around their necks, but they still refuse," Herzl commented.

Shortly afterwards, the British withdrew their offer of land in East Africa.

In fiction
 The story of the 1904 expedition, as well as an imagined vision of a Jewish state in Uasin Gishu, is told in Lavie Tidhar's novelette "Uganda", in his 2007 collection HebrewPunk.
 Adam Rovner's "What If the Jewish State Had Been Established in East Africa", a travel guide for the fictional Jewish homeland of New Judea, located in present-day Uganda, won the 2016 Sidewise Award for Alternate History award for short form alternate history. According to Adam Rovner the plan was appealing to early Zionists as it "twinned the adventures of [Henry Morton] Stanley with the adventurism of the Age of Empire, stagecraft with statecraft."
 In Lavie Tidhar's 2018 novel Unholy Land, a Jewish state called Palestina is established in Africa after the 1904 expedition returns a positive report. It was shortlisted for several awards, including the Sidewise Award for Alternate History, and builds on the author's earlier story, "Uganda".

See also
 Abayudaya
 Madagascar Plan
 Jewish Autonomous Oblast
 Slattery Report
 Fugu Plan
 Beta Israel
 Lemba people
 Proposals for a Jewish state
 Jewish Territorialist Organization
 History of the Jews in Uganda

References

Bibliography

External links
 Jewish Virtual Library on Uganda Proposal

East Africa Protectorate
Uasin Gishu County
History of Kenya
History of Zionism
History of the Jews in Africa
Settlement schemes in the British Empire
Proposed countries
Jewish settlement schemes
Jewish Ugandan history
Jewish Kenyan history
Settlement schemes in Africa